Cancellotti is an Italian surname. Notable people with the surname include:

 Francesco Cancellotti (born 1963), Italian tennis player
  (1896–1986), Italian architect
 Tommaso Cancellotti (born 1992), Italian footballer

Italian-language surnames